Frederick Philip Lenz, III, also known as Rama (Sanskrit: राम) and Atmananda (Sanskrit: आतमाननद; February 9, 1950 in San Diego, California – April 12, 1998) was a spiritual teacher who taught what he termed American Buddhism, including the teachings of Tibetan Buddhism, Zen, Vedanta, and Mysticism. Lenz also was an author, software designer, businessman, and record producer.

Biography

Childhood and adolescence

Lenz was born February 9, 1950, at Mercy Hospital in San Diego, California. At the age of three, he and his family moved to Stamford, Connecticut. He spent the rest of his childhood and teenage years there, attending schools in the Stamford area.

Lenz's father, Frederick Lenz Jr., worked as a marketing executive and later went on to become the mayor of Stamford from 1973 to 1975. His mother, Dorothy Gumaer Lenz, was a housewife and a student of astrology.

After high school, he spent a short period of incarceration in a low security camp near San Diego for possession of marijuana, a misdemeanor offense which was later removed from the court records by way of a dismissal. According to his own account, he then traveled to Kathmandu, Nepal and encountered a Tibetan Buddhist monk who informed him that in the future, he would help millions of people and carry on the teachings of a lineage that had almost disappeared.

Education
Lenz graduated from Rippowam High School in 1967. He later attended the University of Connecticut, where he majored in English and minored in Philosophy. He was inducted as a member of the Phi Beta Kappa honor society in 1973 and graduated magna cum laude.

After college, he won a competitive State of New York Graduate Council Fellowship enabling him to continue his studies. He earned a Master of Arts and a Doctor of Philosophy from State University of New York at Stony Brook. His doctoral dissertation was on "The Evolution of Matter and Spirit in the Poetry of Theodore Roethke".

Spiritual Teachings 

Lenz stated he first went into samadhi, or a state of spiritual absorption, at the age of three. In his books Surfing the Himalayas and Snowboarding to Nirvana, he stated that traveling to sacred locations heightened his experiences in meditation.

Beginning in 1972, Lenz became a student of Hindu guru Sri Chinmoy, who gave him the name "Atmananda," meaning "rejoicing in the soul."

At the end of 1982, Lenz adopted the teaching name of "Rama" and stated that he was not the historical Rama but rather represented a warrior quality implied in that name.  Lenz said that he remembered all his previous reincarnations, including his life as a high priest in Atlantis, and as a teacher in ancient Egypt, India, Japan, and Tibet.

His students wrote that they witnessed him perform miracles, or siddha powers, including levitation, teleportation, disappearing, turning rooms to molten gold light, projecting light from his hands, and transforming into an old, bearded Asian man before their eyes.  He often took his students on field trips to the deserts of Southern California and to Disneyland where a number of these events were witnessed.

Lenz said that the core of his teachings was contained in his books, Snowboarding to Nirvana and Surfing the Himalayas, the latter was a national best-seller. The singer Tina Turner noted that she keeps a copy of Surfing the Himalayas in her prayer room. Lenz's teaching focused on modern spiritual enlightenment through the application of Eastern religious principles. The main themes of his teachings in American Buddhism included the engaged practice of meditation, Zen, living and working in the world, and the enlightenment of women. 

In 1981, after moving back to San Diego, he ended his association with Chinmoy and founded his own teaching center initially called Lakshmi.

"Self-discovery is the essential core of all of Rama's teaching", according to Zoe Nicholson. "The principle is simple; that inside of each woman and man is the Self, Nirvana, Eternity. It has been covered with layers of conditioning, lifetimes of tendencies and fear of the unknown. Through the practice of Self Discovery all these layers are peeled back eventually revealing one's true nature: perfect pure light."

For 27 years, Lenz taught spiritual classes and seminars and public meditations. Although students completed college-style applications, he accepted students based on "his intuition and his sense of what each student needs."

During that time, the core of the spiritual study was meditation. Lenz explained to his students, “You concentrate so intensely, you bring your will to such a singular point that you break through all the limited mind states. You bring in so much kundalini because your focus is so intense that you snap out of the limited mental states into higher mental states, and then, of course, you experience the pure, shining void in whatever form you’re capable of experiencing it as, from your sentient mind state, and that in itself is ecstasy.”  

With the primary focus on meditation, Lenz went on to put the practice itself into a wider framework: “Meditate and realize that when you meditate, no matter how high you go, no matter how deeply you perceive, that you’re only touching the bare surface of infinity. Just hold in mind the fact that beyond your perception is ecstasy. Not far beyond. Just with the stoppage of thought there’s ecstasy—power, understanding, in limitless amounts. And no matter how far you go, you can never experience all of it. And if you dissolve the self completely, it doesn’t end.”

Software designer 

Lenz advocated students going into computer science, because of the mental challenge diverse career opportunities, and the strong pay rates.

Many students became skilled programmers and went on to form their own software companies, with Lenz acting as co-designer and thought leader. These companies included AutoSys (sold to Platinum Technology in 1995), CS10000, Vantage Point (VP-Med and SmartCare), Vayu Web, and Eagle Ray Project Management Software (sold to Primavera).

Music career 

Lenz was the producer for the rock band, Zazen, which produced 31 albums in 13 years. The group also released several music videos. Lenz was also co-composer of the album Ecologie (credited under "Rama") and the soundtrack for 704 Hauser.

Criticisms and controversy

Lenz received criticism from the sect-monitoring movement.

A small number of Lenz's students became involved with several sect watchdog groups, including the CAN (Cult Awareness Network).

Several disgruntled parents formed a group, Lenz-Watch, that "kept tabs" on Lenz because they considered him a "danger to society." The group focused on placing negative media about Frederick Lenz wherever he lived, taught, or wherever his students taught. Two of the parents paid kidnappers to deprogram their adult children with unsuccessful results.

Death and his estate
Lenz drowned in the bay next to his home on April 12, 1998, the victim of an apparent suicide. He stated that his death was a protest against how spiritual teachers are treated in America. He left a gross estate of approximately $23 million. His will was a matter of dispute between the National Audubon Society and his estate, which was settled by a donation to the National Audubon Society, and the creation of the Frederick P. Lenz Foundation for American Buddhism, which at the time was headed by Lenz's accountant, Norman Marcus (executor of his will) and Norman Oberstein, his attorney. This act fulfilled provisions of the will necessary to apply the funds from Lenz's estate to the creation of the Lenz Foundation. Claims by two persons who contested the will were withdrawn and dismissed. His estate was settled in 2002. The Frederick P. Lenz Foundation for American Buddhism has engaged in substantial grant making activity (over $7 million to date) to approximately 140 American Buddhist organizations from 2003 onwards. As part of the settlement with Audubon, a gorge was named for Lenz at the Sharon Audubon Center in northwest Connecticut.

Publications

Books
Frederick Lenz published eight books between 1979 and 1997.

 Lifetimes: True Accounts of Reincarnation, 1979, Fawcett Crest, New York
 Total Relaxation: The Complete Program for Overcoming Stress, Tension, Worry, and Fatigue, 1980, The Bobbs-Merrill Company, Indianapolis
 Meditation: The Bridge is Flowing but The River is Not, 1981, Lakshmi Publications, Malibu, CA, Revised 1983
 The Wheel of Dharma, 1982, Lakshmi Publications, Malibu, CA
 The Last Incarnation, 1983, Lakshmi Publications, Malibu, CA
 Insights: Tantric Buddhist Reflections on Life, 1994, Interglobal Seminars, New York
 Surfing the Himalayas, 1995, St. Martin's Press, New York
 Snowboarding to Nirvana, 1997, St. Martin's Press, New York

Films and video recordings
 Tantric Buddhism with Rama 1993 (ASIN: B002VAMPA0)
 Canyons of Light & Cayman Blue 2011 (ASIN: B006FBYL)
Signs of a Rebel Buddha (starring)

Further reading 
American Buddhist Rebel: The Story of Rama - Dr. Frederick Lenz. Liz Lewinson. 2016. .
American Zen: The Wisdom of an American Zenji. Y. Ohta. 2009. CreateSpace. .
Art of Rama, The: Interviews with Direct Students of Rama. Marsha Pritchard. 2011. CreateSpace. .
Last Incarnation, The: Experiences with Rama in Southern California. Compilation. 1983. Los Angeles. The Frederick P. Lenz Foundation for American Buddhism. .
Passionate Heart, The. Zoe Nicholson, Lune Soleil Press, 2003, .
Road Trip Mind. by Uncle Tantra (Barry Wright). 2001. Online Only (click footnote for link).
Unplugging the Patriarchy. Lucia Rene. 2009. Williamsburg, VA. Crown Chakra Publishing. .
Worlds of Power, Worlds of Light. Jenna Sundell. 2013. Electric Bliss Publishing. .
Rama Speaks: The Teachings of Rama-Dr. Frederick Lenz. Lawrence Borok. 2021. Lawrence S. Borok. ,,.

References

External links 
 
 The Frederick P. Lenz Foundation for American Buddhism

1950 births
1998 deaths
Buddhism in the United States
American religious leaders
People from San Diego
Writers from Stamford, Connecticut
People from Old Field, New York